Millionaire pie is an American icebox pie. This pie is a dish popular in the Southern United States, Texas, and New Mexico. It is made of whipped cream or whipped topping, crushed pineapple, and chopped pecans with a graham cracker crust, although the ingredients are modifiable. Some versions include condensed milk, cream cheese, flaked coconut, and/or cherry pie filling or maraschino cherries.  However, the whipped topping or whipped cream, pineapple, and crust are essential ingredients, although the type of crust (e.g. graham cracker, shortbread) can vary. 

This is a type of icebox pie, which became popular between 1930 and 1950 with the adoption of refrigerators in the United States.

The pie and variations of it are sometimes referred to as billionaire's pie, billion dollar pie, million dollar pie, or Hawaiian million dollar pie.

Furr's Cafeteria and Luby's both featured the dessert on their menu.

See also
 List of pies, tarts and flans
 List of foods of the Southern United States

References

South Carolina culture
Cuisine of the Southern United States
American pies
No bake cakes
Foods containing coconut
Pineapple dishes
Cheese desserts
Sweet pies